This is a list of mountains in Hunan.

List

References

Bibliography